Aidas Preikšaitis (born 15 July 1970) is a Lithuanian former professional footballer who played as a midfielder.

Club career
Preikšaitis was born in Akmenė. He represented FK Žalgiris Vilnius from 1989 to 1997. His former teams include 1. FC Union Berlin, Kickers Emden, KSZO Ostrowiec Świętokrzyski Wisla Plock S.S.A. 1947, Swit Nowy Dwor Mazowiecki.

He played 6 games and scored 1 goal in the UEFA Intertoto Cup 1997 for FC Torpedo-Luzhniki Moscow.

International career
Preikšaitis made 48 appearances for the Lithuania national football team from 1992 to 2006.

Honours
Žalgiris
 Lithuanian A Lyga: 1991, 1992

Lithuania
 Baltic Cup: 1992

References

External links
 
 Aidas Preiksaitis at immerunioner.de

1970 births
Living people
People from Akmenė
Association football midfielders
Soviet footballers
Lithuanian footballers
Lithuania international footballers
Lithuanian expatriate footballers
FK Žalgiris players
FC Torpedo Moscow players
Russian Premier League players
FC KAMAZ Naberezhnye Chelny players
GKS Katowice players
OKS Stomil Olsztyn players
1. FC Union Berlin players
KSZO Ostrowiec Świętokrzyski players
Kickers Emden players
Wisła Płock players
Expatriate footballers in Russia
Expatriate footballers in Poland
Expatriate footballers in Germany
Lithuanian expatriate sportspeople in Russia
Lithuanian expatriate sportspeople in Poland
Lithuanian expatriate sportspeople in Germany